KRT40 is a keratin gene.